Bull Dog Breed may refer to:

Bulldog type
"The Bull Dog Breed", 1930 short story by American writer Robert E. Howard
Bulldog Breed, 1962 British TV sitcom
The Bulldog Breed, 1960 British film